
Tabitha Gilman Tenney (1762–1837) was an early American author from Exeter, New Hampshire.

Writing 
Tenney's novel Female Quixotism, Exhibited in the Romantic Opinions and Extravagant Adventures of Dorcasina Sheldon, which followed Cervantes in attacking the delusions encouraged by romantic literature, was first published in two volumes in 1801.

Literary historian F. L. Patee has described Female Quixotism  (1801) as the most popular novel written in America prior to the publication of Uncle Tom's Cabin in 1852. Female Quixotism went through at least five editions and was still in print when Harriet Beecher Stowe wrote her landmark book.

A quote from page 23 of her book shows signs of an early feminist attitude: "Those enemies to female improvement thought a woman had no business with any book but the bible, or perhaps the art of cookery; believing that everything beyond these served only to disqualify her for the duties of domestic life."

Family life 
Tabitha was a teenager during the American Revolution. Exeter was the Revolutionary capitol of New Hampshire. She was the second cousin of Nicholas Gilman, NH State Treasurer during the American Revolution. Her uncle Peter Gilman was a Brigadier. Her parents were Samuel and Lydia.

In 1788, she married Samuel Tenney, a former army surgeon. They had no children. He was elected to Congress in 1788. He became a long-time judge in Exeter. Their house originally stood next door to the town hall and courthouse, but was moved, and currently stands at 65 High Street.

Upon her 1837 death in Exeter, she was buried at the Winter Street Burial Ground.

Further reading

By Tenney
 New Pleasing Instructor
 Tabitha Tenney. Female quixotism: exhibited in the romantic opinions and extravagant adventures of Dorcasina Sheldon.
 Boston: Printed by I. Thomas and E.T. Andrews, 1801.
 Boston: J. P. Peaslee, 1825. Google books v.1
Oxford University Press, 1991 "Female Quixotism" with foreword by feminist scholars

About Tenney
 "Tabitha Tenney" in: Evert Augustus Duyckinck, George Long Duyckinck. Cyclopaedia of American Literature. NY: C. Scribner, 1856. Google books
 
 Cynthia J. Miecznikowski. The Parodic Mode and the Patriarchal Imperative: Reading the Female Reader(s) in Tabitha Tenney's "Female Quixotism". Early American Literature, Vol. 25, No. 1 (1990), pp. 34–45
 Linda Frost. The Body Politic in Tabitha Tenney's "Female Quixotism". Early American Literature, Vol. 32, No. 2 (1997), pp. 113–134
Gretchen McBride, scholar, "Rediscovering Tabitha Tenney" lecture on video  Rediscovering Tabitha Gilman Tenney

References

External links
  WorldCat. Tabitha Tenney
  Open Library. Female Quixotism

1762 births
1837 deaths
19th-century American novelists
American women novelists
Gilman family of New Hampshire
People from Exeter, New Hampshire
Novelists from New Hampshire
19th-century American women writers